A go-fast boat is a small, fast power boat designed with a long narrow platform and a planing hull.

During the United States alcohol prohibition era, these boats were used in "rum-running", transferring illegal liquor from larger vessels waiting outside US territorial waters to the mainland. Their high speed enabled them to avoid interception by the law enforcement. The present conception of such boats is based largely on designs by Donald Aronow for offshore powerboat racing in the 1960s. During this period, these boats were also used by drug smugglers to transfer drugs across the Caribbean to the United States.

Name

Go-fast boats are also called "cigarette boats" and "cigar boats"—references to their shape, though some report that they are references to items they were used to smuggle.

"Cigarette boat" is especially popular because it is a brand name for a line of go-fast boats that popularized and largely defined the class in the 1960s, made by Don Aronow's Cigarette Racing Team.  "Cigar boat" is often preferred because it avoids confusion with that brand.

Construction

They are heavy enough to cut through higher waves, although slower.

Use
Reflecting their racing heritage, accommodations on these five-or-fewer-passenger boats are minimal. A small low cabin under the foredeck is typical, much smaller than a typical motor yacht of similar size. In addition to racing, most buyers buy these boats for their mystique, immense power, high top speeds, and sleek shape.

Illegal use

These boats are difficult to detect by radar except on flat calm seas or at close range. The United States Coast Guard and the DEA found them to be stealthy, fast, seaworthy, and very difficult to intercept using conventional craft. Because of this, Coast Guards have developed their own high-speed craft and use helicopters equipped with anti-materiel rifles used to disable engines of fleeing boats. The US Coast Guard go-fast boat is a rigid-hulled inflatable boat (RHIB) equipped with radar and powerful engines. The RHIB is armed with several types of non-lethal weapons and an M240 GPMG.

Media portrayal
In the 2006 film Miami Vice, go-fast boats are used to smuggle drugs for cartels.

See also
Narco-submarine
Night Train seizure, one of the largest drug seizures in history.
Poker run
Supercavitating propeller
Tunnel hull

References

Further reading
Don Aronow: The King of Thunderboat Row. (1994), by Michael Aronow.  Write Stuff Enterprises. , .
Secrets of Tunnel Boat Design, JD Russell, P. Eng.

External links
Congressional testimony on technologies for detecting go-fast boats

Smuggling
Motorboats